The 2011–12 Sporting de Gijón season was the 4th successive season that the club played in La Liga, the highest tier of football in Spain.

Squad

On loan

Transfers

In

Out

Competitions

La Liga

Results by round

Matches

Notes
César Sánchez was sent off while being an unused sub.

League table

Copa del Rey

Matches

Squad statistics

Appearances and goals

|-
|colspan="14"|Players who appeared for Sporting de Gijón no longer at the club:

|}

Top scorers

Disciplinary record

References

Sporting de Gijón seasons
Sporting de Gijon